The 2010 NRL Under-20s season was the third season of the National Rugby League's Under 20s competition and was known commercially as the 2010 Toyota Cup due to sponsorship by Toyota. Solely for players under 20 years of age, the draw and structure of the competition mirrored that of the 2010 NRL Telstra Premiership season.

Season summary

Schedule

Ladder
Teams highlighted in green indicates that they have qualified for the top 8 playoffs.

Finals series

Grand final

Three second-half tries in 10 minutes helped the Warriors run all over the Rabbits in Sydney.
 
After holding a slender 12–10 lead at the break, the Warriors turned on the after-burners with halfback Shaun Johnson leading the charge through an impressive kicking and running display.

Though for the first seven minutes after kick off it was a different story, with Souths’ halfback Adam Reynolds getting an early 40/20 and showing his chipping and kicking skills to force the Warriors to line drop out early.

But, despite the early pressure from the Rabbitohs, the Warriors taught them a lesson on how to turn pressure into points and they did so with their first foray into opposition territory.

A Shaun Johnson in-goal grubber was unable to be controlled by South's fullback Malcolm Webster and Elijah Taylor was first on the scene to slap a hand on it. Johnson converted for the Warriors to lead 6–0.

Within seconds, Shaun Johnson was the architect of the Warriors second try, running the ball and offloading with an over-the-top pass for Siuatonga Likiliki to get his 19th try of the season. Johnson converted off the post from wide out for a 12–0 lead.

The Rabbitohs had their chances, held up within the first few minutes of the match and going close but for a knock on in the 20th minute, but struggled to adapt with the big warriors pack able to get 60 metres each set, skillfully followed up by the excellent kicking games of Shaun Johnson and five-eight Carlos Tuimavave.

But the big pack and wide men were caught out in the 27th minute. Souths had a scrum 70 metres out and Reynolds let loose with a kick for his speedsters to chase. Souths 17-year-old flyer James Roberts left all in his dust, nudged it over the line with his foot and fell on the pill. Reynolds converted for 12–6.

The Warriors suddenly looked rattled, kicking out on the full to hand over possession and Souths rubbed salt in a wound when Matt Mundine gave Taioalo Vaivai the space needed to stretch out and score. The conversion missed and the Warriors had a two-point lead, 12–10.

Ten minutes into the second half the Warriors took advantage of a weak Rabbitoh's blindside defence. A Shaun Johnson grubber ended up under the hand of Elijah Taylor for the stand-in captain to score his second try and the kick taking his side out to 18–10.

Two minutes later, Siuatonga Likiliki showed his class to bump off six would-be tacklers, offload to fullback Glen Fisiiahi who stepped inside to score. Johnson kept his perfect record intact and converted again for 24–10.

Then the floodgates opened – if they hadn't already.

Shaun Johnson, the classiest on the park along with Jack Gibson medal winner, Carlos Tuimavave, chipped and regathered then flung the ball out from underneath him to the man-mountain that is Sam Lousi to score. Johnson converted for a 30–10 score line.

Then it was the turn of "The Junior Beast", Elijah Niko, to force his way across the line and Johnson highlighted the total control by once again adding the extras, 36–10.

The Warriors eased, and Rabbitohs' lock Blake Judd and captain Nathan Peats managed to grab two late tries to make the score respectable at 36–22.

But the Warriors were not done, Nafe Seluini accelerating away to slide under the posts. Johnson added his seventh conversion from as many attempts for 42–22.

The match was well over when big Jack Tulemau added a consolation try in the final minutes for Souths.

 New Zealand Warriors 42 (Elijah Taylor 2, Siuatonga Likiliki, Glen Fisiiahi, Sam Lousi, Elijah Niko, Nafetalai Seluini tries; Shaun Johnson 7/7 goals)

 South Sydney Rabbitohs 28 (James Roberts, Taioalo Vaivai, Blake Judd, Nathan Peats, Jack Tulemau tries; Adam Reynolds 4/5 goals)

Half-Time: New Zealand 12-10

Jack Gibson Medal:  Carlos Tuimavave

Player statistics

Leading try scorers

Most tries in a game

Leading point scorers

Most points in a game

Leading goal scorers

Most goals in a game

Leading field goal scorers

Club statistics

Biggest Wins

Winning Streaks

 QF = Qualifying Finals
 SF = Semi-finals
 PF = Preliminary Finals
 GF = Grand Final

Losing Streaks

 QF = Qualifying Finals
 SF = Semi-finals
 PF = Preliminary Finals
 GF = Grand Final

2010 in rugby league

Awards

Player of the Year
The winner of the award is decided by the most votes during the year as decided by the referee of each game on a 3-2-1 basis for each game played throughout the regular season.

Winner:
Tariq Sims,  Brisbane

Team Of The Year
Voted on by the 16 Toyota Cup coaches, with the players with the highest votes in each position selected.

References

External links
NRL.com - Official site of the NYC, National Youth Competition

 
NRL Under-20s season